Kerry Cooks (born March 28, 1974) is an American football coach and former player.

Biography
Cooks was born on March 28, 1974 in Dallas, Texas. He is a graduate of the University of Iowa, where he was a team captain on the football team, and is married with two children. Cooks was inducted into the Irving Independent School District Hall of Fame Class of 2013.

Professional playing career
Cooks was originally drafted by the Minnesota Vikings in 1998 and later that year signed and played with the Green Bay Packers. He would also play with the Atlanta Falcons and Jacksonville Jaguars before retiring from the NFL before playing with the Chicago Enforcers of the XFL in 2001.

Coaching career
After having coached at the high school level, Cooks joined the Kansas State Wildcats as a graduate assistant in 2003. He later coached defensive backs at Western Illinois and Minnesota. Cooks spent four seasons at the University of Wisconsin coaching defensive backs. From 2010–2014, he served as secondary coach at the University of Notre Dame (adding the role of Co-defensive Coordinator in 2012).  In 2015, Cooks was hired by Bob Stoops to become the secondary coach at the University of Oklahoma. In 2019, he joined Texas Tech as safeties coach.
In 2022 he went to LSU as the team’s safeties coach.

See also
List of Green Bay Packers players

References

External links
 Oklahoma profile

1974 births
Living people
American football defensive backs
Atlanta Falcons players
Chicago Enforcers players
Green Bay Packers players
Iowa Hawkeyes football players
Jacksonville Jaguars players
Kansas State Wildcats football coaches
LSU Tigers football coaches
Minnesota Golden Gophers football coaches
Notre Dame Fighting Irish football coaches
Oklahoma Sooners football coaches
Western Illinois Leathernecks football coaches
Wisconsin Badgers football coaches
High school football coaches in Texas
Sportspeople from Dallas
Players of American football from Dallas
African-American coaches of American football
African-American players of American football
21st-century African-American sportspeople
20th-century African-American sportspeople